Gaspar Enrique Páez (born 16 August 1986) is an Argentine footballer. His last club was Ñublense.

References
 
 

1986 births
Living people
Argentine footballers
Argentine expatriate footballers
Boca Unidos footballers
Correcaminos UAT footballers
Defensores de Belgrano footballers
Deportes Temuco footballers
Primera B de Chile players
Expatriate footballers in Chile
Expatriate footballers in Mexico
Expatriate footballers in Venezuela
Association football midfielders
Footballers from La Plata